Narodowe Zjednoczenie Wojskowe (National Military Union, NZW) was a Polish anti-Communist organization, founded in November 1944, after collapse of the Warsaw Uprising. It was among the largest and strongest resistance organisations established in the PRL in mid- and late 1940s. The NZW consisted mostly of members of the destroyed Narodowe Siły Zbrojne.

NZW's first commander was Colonel Tadeusz Danilewicz, then Colonel Bogusław Banasik. The organisation was organised into sixteen "areas" and was most active in the districts of Białystok, Lublin and Rzeszów. It had several armed units, called Pogotowie Walki Zbrojnej, which fought many skirmishes with both the NKVD and the Soviet Red Army. Its headquarters were destroyed in early spring of 1946, when Stalinist secret police arrested hundreds of its members. However, several units remained active until the mid-1950s.

See also

 Cursed soldiers

Sources
 http://portalwiedzy.onet.pl/39559,,,,narodowe_zjednoczenie_wojskowe,haslo.html
 http://powstanie-warszawskie-1944.ac.pl/zw_nzw.htm
 http://www.zebrane-doswiadczenia.salon24.pl/30841,index.html

Poland in World War II
Polish dissident organisations
National liberation movements
Anti-communism in Poland
Paramilitary organisations based in Poland
National Democracy